Western Samoa competed at the 1992 Summer Olympics in Barcelona, Spain.

Nauruan weightlifter and future president Marcus Stephen obtained Samoan citizenship and competed for Samoa at the 1992 Olympics.

Competitors
The following is the list of number of competitors in the Games.

References

Official Olympic Reports
Sports of World: Samoa at the 1992 Summer Olympics

Nations at the 1992 Summer Olympics
1992
1992 in Samoan sport